EKG may refer to:
 EKG (album), by Edyta Górniak
 Afric Aviation, a Gabonese airline
 Ekari language
 Electrocardiography
 Evangelisches Kirchengesangbuch, a hymnal